The British Association for Canadian Studies (BACS) was established by a constitution adopted in 1975 and is a membership-based academic association that is also a registered UK charity (#272144). BACS is a member of the International Council for Canadian Studies (ICCS), of which it was a founder member in 1981. Presidents of BACS attend the Annual Meetings of ICCS in Canada each year. The association’s aim is to promote interest in Canada, Canadian issues, and culture in academic circles and in the general community in the UK. It has two main activities: the British Journal of Canadian Studies (BJCS) and the Annual Conference.

References

External links
 BACS Official Website
 ICCS Official Website

Educational institutions established in 1975
Research organisations in the United Kingdom
1975 establishments in the United Kingdom
Canada–United Kingdom relations